The 2017 Intercontinental GT Challenge was the second season of the Intercontinental GT Challenge. The season featured three rounds, starting with the Liqui Moly Bathurst 12 Hour on 5 February and concluding with the Mazda Raceway California 8 Hours on 15 October, after the SRO Motorsports Group chose to cancel the Sepang 12 Hours scheduled for 10 December, due to a lack of entries. Laurens Vanthoor was the defending drivers' champion and Audi was the defending manufacturers' champion.

In contrast to the inaugural season, manufacturers no longer needed to enter their cars separately. In 2017, as long as they held an international licence, all cars and drivers entered in the overall GT3 class, together with the manufacturers in the overall GT4 class were automatically eligible to score points towards the titles.

Calendar

Entry list

GT3

GT4

Race results

Championship standings
Scoring system
Championship points were awarded for the first ten positions in each race. Entries were required to complete 75% of the winning car's race distance in order to be classified and earn points, with the exception of Bathurst where a car simply had to cross the finish line to be classified. Individual drivers were required to participate for a minimum of 25 minutes in order to earn championship points in any race. A manufacturer only received points for its two highest placed cars in each round.

Drivers' championship
The results indicate the classification relative to other drivers in the series, not the classification in the race. For unknown reasons some drivers were ineligible to score points. It is unknown which drivers that did not finish in a points scoring position were ineligible to score points.

Notes
1 – Jules Gounon's result with Acura did not count, because he got a better result with Audi.
2 – Jeroen Bleekemolen's result with Mercedes-Benz did not count, because he got a better result with Porsche.
3 – Charles Espenlaub and Charles Putman's result with PROsport Porsche did not count, because they got a better result with Aston Martin.

Manufacturers' championships
If more than two cars of a specific manufacturer finished in the top 10, these cars would be considered invisible and their points would be redistributed to the next eligible car.

GT3

GT4

Notes
1 – Results did not count towards championship.

See also
Intercontinental GT Challenge

Notes

References

External links

 
2017 in motorsport